This article contains a list of all matches played during the 2023 Super Rugby Pacific regular season.

Round 1

Round 2 – Super Round

Round 3

Round 4

Round 5

Round 6

Round 7

Round 8

Round 9

Round 10

Round 11

Round 12

Round 13

Round 14

Round 15

See also
 2023 Super Rugby Pacific season

Notes

References

2023 Super Rugby Pacific season
Super Rugby lists